Barney McCoy (26 March 1896 – 11 June 1970) was an Australian cricketer. He played two first-class matches for New South Wales between 1920/21 and 1923/24.

See also
 List of New South Wales representative cricketers

References

External links
 

1896 births
1970 deaths
Australian cricketers
New South Wales cricketers